The 371st Sustainment Brigade is an Ohio Army National Guard Sustainment Brigade. It is based out of Springfield, Ohio. The 371st Sustainment Brigade is made up of the 371st Special Troops Battalion (Newark, Ohio) and the 112th Transportation Battalion (Green, Ohio).

Brigade History 

The Headquarters 371st Sustainment Brigade was constituted on 29 August 1917 as the Headquarters 62nd Field Artillery Brigade, 37th Infantry Division.  The 62nd FA Brigade owes its inception to the fact that, in the early days of 1917, the patriotic citizens of Ohio insisted that the Ohio Troops be organized into a complete Division. In order to accomplish this, three regiments of Field Artillery were hurriedly formed to support the two Ohio Infantry Brigades (73rd and 74th).

The Field Artillery in Ohio prior to 1914, consisted of one organization whose history dates back to 6 July 1837. This organization was reorganized from a section to form a regiment in 1860, and saw service for the duration of the American Civil War. It was mustered into service once more in 1898, for active duty in the Spanish–American War, but, contrary to expectations, did not serve outside the continental limits of the United States. In 1899, the Regiment was reduced in size, and, on 23 September 1911, the three remaining Batteries were designated the Battalion of Field Artillery, Ohio National Guard.

This Battalion was ordered to Mexican Border duty on 16 July 1916, and served until 12 March 1917. On 4 May 1917, the Battalion was expanded into a Regiment, and, on 15 September 1917, became a part of the 62nd Brigade of Field Artillery.

The pressing need of a Brigade of Field Artillery in 1917, was responsible for a newly formed Regiment of Ohio Cavalry being expanded and changed into three Regiments of Field Artillery. These two new Regiments, and the original Field Artillery Regiment, were then grouped together under the designation of the 62nd Field Artillery Brigade, and Ohio had the Artillery that was necessary for the support of the Division.

The 62nd FA Brigade was constituted on 29 August 1917 and organized on 21 September 1917. The 62nd was made up of the 134th FA Regiment, 135th FA Regiment, 136th FA Regiment, 112th Trench Mortar Battery, and 112th Ammunition Train.  The 62nd conducted training as an element of the 37th ID at Camp Sheridan, Alabama and was separated from the 37th when they arrived in France in June 1918. After arriving on the Western Front (World War I) the brigade and its units supported various units during the final months of the war, including the 92nd, 28th and 33rd Divisions.

The Headquarters Battery was organized in Dayton and federally recognized on 26 April 1922 under the command of Captain William G. Steven. The brigade converted from horse drawn to motor drawn in October 1934.

After the beginning of World War II in Europe, the headquarters battery was inducted into federal service on 15 October 1940. It was dispatched to Camp Shelby, Mississippi for training with the 37th Infantry Division.  On 1 February 1942 it was reorganized as the 37th Division Artillery (DIVARTY) and served in the pacific theater under the 37th ID. The 37th ID, commanded by BG Leo M. Kreber, and was mobilized through 18 December 1945 in support of WWII where it earned the Philippine Presidential Unit Citation.  During WWII the 37th DIVARTY was made up of the 134th, 135th, and 136th FA Regiments.

The 37th DIVARTY was converted, reorganized, and designated the 371st Antiaircraft Artillery Group on 3 July 1946.

The 371st Antiaircraft Artillery Group was converted, reorganized, and designated the 371st Artillery Group on 1 September 1959. From 1959 to 1968, the 137th Air Defense Artillery Regiment was part of the force. 2-137 & 3-137 served with 371 AGAD from 1 September 1959 to 1 February 1968, which 1-137 served with the 137 AGAD, until 1 April 1963, and then transferred to the 371 AGAD, 1 April 1963, to 1 February 1972.

The 371st Artillery Group was converted, reorganized, and designated the 371st Corps Support Group on 1 February 1972.
The Headquarters 371st Corps Support Group, commanded by COL Rufus J. Smith, was deployed from 10 April 2003 to 19 March 2004 to Iraq to serve during the War in Iraq.

Operation Vigilant Relief.  The Headquarters 371st Corps Support Group, commanded by Colonel Michael E. Beasley, was called to duty to in September 2005 and operated out of Kiln, Mississippi to assist in the aftermath of Hurricane Katrina.

The 371st Corps Support Group was reorganized and designated the 371st Sustainment Brigade on 1 September 2007.

Operation Iraqi Freedom.  The Headquarters 371st Sustainment Brigade, commanded by COL Daniel L. Tack, was deployed from 27 July 2008 to 9 April 2009 in support of OIF.

Operation Enduring Freedom.  The Headquarters 371st Sustainment Brigade, commanded by COL Gregory W. Robinette, was deployed from 19 April 2013 to 1 March 2014 in support of OEF.

Operation Spartan Shield and Operation Inherent Resolve. The Headquarters 371st Sustainment Brigade, commanded by COL Gregory J. Betts, was deployed from 27 April 2017 to 10 March 2018 in support of CENTCOM.

The 371st Sustainment Brigade was activated as Joint Task Force (JTF) Fox from 14 June 2020 until TBD under Title 32 502(f) in response to the State of Ohio's fight against Novel Coronavirus Disease 2019 (COVID-19).  The JTF provided logistical and operational support at community-based COVID testing and vaccination sites, medical support to nursing facilities, support to 15 foodbanks around Ohio, support to the Ohio Department of Rehabilitation and Corrections (ODRC), support to the Ohio Depart of Aging (ODA), the Ohio Department of Heath (ODH), and the Ohio Department of Jobs and Family Services (ODJFS).

See also
 Transformation of the United States Army

References

External links 
 The Institute of Heraldry, : 371 Sustainment Brigade
 The Center for Military History: 371 Sustainment Brigade
 Facebook, 371 Sustainment Brigade
 Employment of the Ohio National Guard in a Racial Disturbance, 1-7 September 1966, Dayton, Ohion, pp87-96, in Robert W. Coakley, Paul J. Scheips, Vincent H. Demma, Use of Troops in Civil Disturbances Since World War II, 1945-1965, Center for Military History, Study 75, Revised Edition, 1971.

Brigades of the United States Army National Guard
371
Newark, Ohio
Ohio National Guard units
Military units and formations in Ohio
Military units and formations established in 2007